Plunder Road is a 1957 American crime film noir directed by Hubert Cornfield and starring Gene Raymond, Jeanne Cooper and Wayne Morris.

Plot
Five men carry out an elaborate plan to rob a gold shipment from a San Francisco-bound US mint train. To throw the police off the track, they split up and drive off in three different directions. Two of the gang's gold-laden trucks are captured by the police, but the third makes it all the way to Los Angeles, where Eddie (Raymond) melts down the gold and disguises it as fittings for his luxury car. On the verge of getting away, he is involved in a freeway accident.

Cast
 Gene Raymond as Eddie Harris 
 Jeanne Cooper as Fran Werner
 Wayne Morris as Commando	Munson
 Elisha Cook Jr. as Skeets Jonas (as Elisha Cook)
 Stafford Repp as Roly Adams
 Steven Ritch as Frankie Chardo
 Nora Hayden as Hazel
 Helene Heigh as Society Woman
 Harry Tyler as Ernie Beach
 Charles J. Conrad as Trooper No. 2 (as Charles Conrad)
 Paul Harber as Trooper No. 1
 Don Garrett as Policeman
 Michael Fox as Smog Officer / Voice of Radio Reporter John Oliver
 Richard Newton as Guard No. 2
 Jim Canino as Tibbs
 Robin Riley as Don
 Douglas Bank as Guard No. 1 / Narrator

Production
The film was known as The Violent Road and filming started July 15 at the Kling Studios.

See also
 List of American films of 1957

References

External links
 
 
 
 
Plunder Road at BFI
 
Essay on film at Film Monthly

1957 films
1957 crime films
20th Century Fox films
American black-and-white films
American crime films
Film noir
Films directed by Hubert Cornfield
Films set in California
American heist films
1950s English-language films
1950s American films